The  Abbey of Santa Maria del Monte (St. Mary of the Mountain) is a Benedictine monastery in Cesena, Italy. This imposing building stands on the Colle Spaziano (Spaziano Hill).

History
The abbey was founded about the year 1001 and completed by 1026, in connection with a small church which housed the remains of St. Mauro, a Benedictine monk who had been the Bishop of Cesena in the first half of the 10th century, and who had the custom of climbing the hill on which the abbey stands in order to pray. His vita was written by the Camaldolese monk and cardinal, Peter Damian. The abbey was confirmed in 1059 by a papal bull of Pope Nicholas II.

The abbey benefited greatly when it received the Emperor Frederic Barbarossa as a guest in 1177. The emperor gave the abbey his protection and bestowed a large grant of land to the community. In 1356, however, the ruler of Forlì, Francesco II Ordelaffi, seized the monastery and used it as a barracks for his troops. The monks fled for over a year. Upon their return, they found the abbey in ruins. The reconstruction lasted for over a century.

Between 1536 and 1548, the abbey church assumed its present-day appearance on the basis of a design by Domenico Gravini of Brisighella, who used an original design by Bramante. As the centre of the artistic life of Cesena, the Basilica del Monte also benefited from the work of major artists in the region: Scipione Sacco, Girolamo Longhi and Francesco Masini. Important works are also attributable to Francesco Morandi, known as the Terribilia, to whom built the dome (decorated by Francesco Masini between 1568 and 1571) and original stone staircase, and to Alessandro Corsi who in 1588 was the creator of the monumental well of the Great Cloister. The church also houses a wooden choir completed in 1575 by Giuseppe d’Alberto di Scalva.

A series of unlucky events led to a crisis for the abbey in the 1600s, which was aggravated by the earthquake of 1768, which destroyed the dome of the basilica. The dome was reconstructed by Pietro Carlo Borboni and decorated by Giuseppe Milani between 1773 and 1774.

The abbey was suppressed in 1796 during the occupation of Italy by the French Revolutionary Army, under Napoleon Bonaparte. The monks were expelled and the contents of the abbey were sold off. The basilica was transferred to the care of the Conventual Franciscans until they too were suppressed in 1810, at which time it was administered by secular clergy. After the restoration of Italian rule, the abbey grounds were returned in 1814 by their current owner, Count Semprini, to Pope Pius VII, who was a native of the city. The pope re-established the abbey in 1819 and made it a part of the Congregation of Santa Giustina, part of a reform movement of monastic life which was headquartered in the Abbey of Santa Giustina in Padua.

One notable member of the community in this period was a young man who was received into the Order in 1827 under the name of Pietro Casaretto. He was to go on and establish a major reform of the congregation, which now extends to almost every continent in the world.

The abbey was again suppressed in 1866. The monks were not able to return to resume their lives until 1874.

Ex-voto
The abbey is also known for housing one of Europe's richest collection of ex-votos (votive tables that date back more than five centuries) During a visit in 1986, Pope John Paul II followed this custom and left one of his own. The abbey is also known for a workshop for antique book restoration that continues to operate today.

References

Sources

  Galleria di alcuni dipinti votivi dell'Abbazia
  Galleria di alcune opera d'arte presenti nell'Abbazia
  Abbazia di Santa Maria del Monte

Renaissance architecture in Emilia-Romagna
Santa Maria del Monte
Benedictine monasteries in Italy
Christian monasteries established in the 11th century
Roman Catholic churches in Cesena